Kamenyak may refer to the following places in Bulgaria:

 Kamenyak, Burgas Province
 Kamenyak, Shumen Province